Cannabidivarin (CBDV, GWP42006) is a non-intoxicating psychoactive cannabinoid found in Cannabis. It is a homolog (chemistry) of cannabidiol (CBD), with the side-chain shortened by two methylene bridges (CH2 units).

Although cannabidivarin (CBDV) is usually a minor constituent of the cannabinoid profile, enhanced levels of CBDV have been reported in feral populations of C. indica  ( = C. sativa ssp. indica var. kafiristanica) from northwest India, and in hashish from Nepal.

CBDV has anticonvulsant effects.  It was identified for the first time in 1969 by Vollner et al.

Similarly to CBD, it has seven double bond isomers and 30 stereoisomers (see: Cannabidiol#Isomerism). It is not scheduled by Convention on Psychotropic Substances. It is being actively developed by GW Pharmaceuticals (as GWP42006) because of a demonstrated neurochemical pathway for previously observed anti-epileptic and anti-convulsive action.  GW has begun a phase 2 trial for adult epilepsy, and is to begin trials of this CBDV product in children in 2016 in Australia.

See also
 List of investigational analgesics

References

External links 
 Erowid Compounds found in Cannabis sativa
 CBDV (in German)
 Cannabidivarin

Phytocannabinoids
Natural phenols
2,6-Dihydroxybiphenyls
Cyclohexenes